The Singles Collection, Volume 3 is a limited edition CD series compilation box set by the English rock band Queen, the third of four sets. The box set contains remastered versions of the next thirteen top-40 charting singles released by Queen that appear subsequent to those in The Singles Collection Volume 2.

The set marks the first time that "Blurred Vision" and the single mix of "Pain Is So Close to Pleasure" have been made available on CD.

Track listing
Disc 1
"It's a Hard Life" – 4:10
"Is This the World We Created...?" – 2:13

Disc 2
"Hammer to Fall" (Single Version) – 3:41
"Tear It Up" – 3:25

Disc 3
"Thank God It's Christmas" – 4:22
"Man on the Prowl" – 3:27
"Keep Passing the Open Windows" – 5:22

Disc 4
"One Vision" (Single Version) – 4:03
"Blurred Vision" – 4:42

Disc 5
"A Kind of Magic" – 4:27
"A Dozen Red Roses For My Darling" – 4:44

Disc 6
"Friends Will Be Friends" – 4:08
"Princes of the Universe" – 3:32

Disc 7
"Pain Is So Close to Pleasure" (Single Remix) – 4:01
"Don't Lose Your Head" – 4:38

Disc 8
"Who Wants to Live Forever" (Single Version) – 4:04
"Forever" – 3:21

Disc 9
"One Year Of Love" – 4:28
"Gimme The Prize" – 4:34

Disc 10
"I Want It All" (Single Version) – 4:03
"Hang On in There" – 3:46

Disc 11
"Breakthru" – 4:10
"Stealin'" – 3:59

Disc 12
"The Invisible Man" – 3:58
"Hijack My Heart" – 4:11

Disc 13
"Scandal" – 4:44
"My Life Has Been Saved" (Original Version) – 3:15

References

External links
 Queen official website: Discography: The Singles Collection Volume 3: includes lyrics of "Hammer To Fall", "One Vision", "Pain is So Close to Pleasure", "I Want It All", "Breakthru", "Blurred Vision", "Gimme The Prize", "Stealin'", "Hijack My Heart".

Queen (band) compilation albums
2010 compilation albums